is a train station in the city of Komoro, Nagano, Japan, operated by East Japan Railway Company (JR East).

Lines
Misato Station is served by the Koumi Line and is 73.8 kilometers from the terminus of the line at Kobuchizawa Station.

Station layout
The station consists of one ground-level side platform serving a single bi-directional track.  The station is unattended.

History
Misato Station opened on 1 December 1988.

Surrounding area

See also
 List of railway stations in Japan

References

External links

 JR East station information 

Railway stations in Nagano Prefecture
Railway stations in Japan opened in 1988
Stations of East Japan Railway Company
Koumi Line
Komoro, Nagano